Rodolfo 'Puey' Quiñones Jr. (more commonly known as Puey Quiñones) is a Filipino fashion designer who alternates between Manila and Los Angeles, California. He is the featured designer mentor in the 2002 award-winning documentary The World's Most Fashionable Prison.

Early life and education
Quiñones was born on February 28, 1980, in Bobon, Northern Samar. His father was a policeman, and his mother, a biology teacher. After three years of studying Political Science at the University of Eastern Philippines, he left the island of Samar to go to Manila.

Quiñones' interest in fashion started when he was in high school in Bobon. He was inspired by his neighbor Dennis Lustico, who became a successful fashion designer in Manila. Quiñones wanted to become a designer, too, but thought that would not be possible, “I thought that in order to become a designer, you must come from a rich family and study fashion design abroad.”

Manila

In 1999, Quiñones moved to Manila to work as an all-around assistant at Lustico's atelier. During work hours, he sewed buttons and hems, but once everyone departed, he made sketches and left them on Lustico's desk. Lustico took notice, and under his mentorship, Quiñones learned the technical skills necessary for the job. Eventually, Lustico recommended him to Bergamo.

At Bergamo, Quiñones designed embroidery for the Barong Tagalog and new cuts for suits in Piña material, taking inspiration from the traditional Filipino suit.

His big break came in 2002, when he became a finalist at The Philippines Young Designers Competition for Paris. Through this competition, he met his first client, Filipino politician TingTing Cojuangco.

In 2005, Quiñones opened an atelier in Bel Air Village in Makati, Philippines, and he organized his first solo show, Swell, where he presented a 30-piece collection made of Koryo silk (a local weave in the Philippines).

Los Angeles

After a decade leading a design house in Manila, Quiñones decided to relocate to Los Angeles, California. He was one of the featured designers for the J Summer Fashion Show, produced by Jessica Minh Ahn, held at One World Trade Center in New York City in June 2014.

In 2015, Quiñones became Creative Director for global bridal brand, Cocomelody.

Partnership

In 2018, Quiñones and partner, Paul Martineau, established Puey Quiñones, Los Angeles in the designer's downtown atelier. They opened two showrooms in Bel-Air Village, Makati: the first for Quiñones’ eponymous fashion brand and the second for Cocomelody bridal wear.

In 2020, the Los Angeles County Museum of Art purchased a Quiñones mini-dress with pouf sleeves for its permanent collection.

Works
Quiñones's designs have been featured in publications, television shows, movies, music videos, and red carpet events.

In June 2014, he presented a 15-piece collection for J Summer Fashion Show in New York City's One World Trade Center, entitled Fly.
Quiñones was a guest designer for America's Next Top Model Cycle 21. He designed clothes using fabrics native to the Philippines for a runway challenge where the contestants had to walk on stilts.
Designed one of Katy Perry's costumes for her Dark Horse (Katy Perry song) music video. 
In October 2017, after eight years, he did a solo fashion show for MEGA Fashion Week SS18 held in Manila, Philippines.  
He dressed HFPA member Janet Nepales and Filipino-American television host and journalist Janelle So-Perkins at the 75th Golden Globe Awards.
ENews! correspondent and TV host, Zuri Hall wore a pink silk taffeta dress by Quiñones to the Met Gala in 2019.

His creations have been worn by celebrities such as Destiny's Child member Michelle Williams (singer), Miss Universe 2012 Olivia Culpo, True Blood actress Rutina Wesley, fashion model and actress Ireland Baldwin, Fuller House actress Lori Loughlin, American rapper MC Lyte, among others.

Quiñones' client list includes the following as well:
Boy Abunda, television host
Kris Aquino, television host and actress
Pops Fernandez, singer 
Imee Marcos, Ilocos Norte governor
Gloria Macapagal Arroyo, 14th president of the Philippines

References

1980 births
Filipino fashion designers
Living people
People from Northern Samar